Sibe may refer to:

Sibe people, an East Asian ethnic group living in China
Xibe language, language of Sibe people
Sibe Mardešić (1927–2016), Croatian mathematician
Nagovisi language, a South Bougainville language spoken in Papua New Guinea

See also 
 Sibe language (disambiguation)